Gare de La Ciotat is a railway station serving the town La Ciotat, Bouches-du-Rhône department, southeastern France. It is situated on the Marseille–Ventimiglia railway, and is served by trains between Marseille, Toulon and Hyères. It is known for the 1895 film L'Arrivée d'un train en gare de La Ciotat, directed and produced by Auguste and Louis Lumière.

References

Railway stations in Bouches-du-Rhône